Anass Zaroury (born 7 November 2000) is a professional footballer who plays as a winger for EFL Championship club Burnley and for the Morocco national team.

Club career
On 1 February 2021, Zaroury joined Belgian First Division A side Charleroi on a two-and-a-half-year deal, returning on loan to Lommel until the end of the season.

On 30 August 2022, Zaroury signed for EFL Championship club Burnley for an undisclosed fee on a four-year deal. He scored his first goal for Burnley in a 4–0 win against Swansea City on 15 October 2022. Zaroury scored the second and third goals as Burnley beat Bournemouth in the 3rd round of the FA Cup in January 2023.

International career 
Born in Belgium, Zaroury is of Moroccan descent. He is a former youth international for Belgium, having played with them up to the Belgium U21s. On 16 November 2022, Zaroury was officially invited to join the Moroccan national team, during the 2022 FIFA World Cup in Qatar, in which he replaced Amine Harit, who suffered an injury one week before the World Cup starts. On 17 November, he made his international debut in a friendly match against Georgia.

Career statistics

References

External links

2000 births
Living people
Sportspeople from Mechelen
Footballers from Antwerp Province
Moroccan footballers
Morocco international footballers
Belgian footballers
Belgium youth international footballers
Belgium under-21 international footballers
Belgian sportspeople of Moroccan descent
Association football wingers
Lommel S.K. players
R. Charleroi S.C. players
Burnley F.C. players
Challenger Pro League players
Belgian Pro League players
Belgian expatriate footballers
Moroccan expatriate sportspeople in England
Moroccan expatriate footballers
Belgian expatriate sportspeople in England
Expatriate footballers in England
2022 FIFA World Cup players